Jacob Island (variant: Wood Island) is one of several uninhabited Canadian arctic islands located in James Bay, Nunavut, Canada. It is situated outside the mouth of Rupert Bay,  from Quebec's Pointe Saouayane on Péninsule Ministikawatin.

References

Islands of James Bay
Uninhabited islands of Qikiqtaaluk Region